Béké Football Club de Bembèrèkè is a football club in Benin. They currently play in the Benin Premier League.

Stadium
Currently the team plays at the 1,000 capacity Stade Municipal de Bembèrèkè.

External links
Soccerway

Football clubs in Benin